Mpongwe is a constituency of the National Assembly of Zambia. It covers the town of Mpongwe and a large rural area in Mpongwe District of Copperbelt Province.

List of MPs

References

Constituencies of the National Assembly of Zambia
Constituencies established in 1991
1991 establishments in Zambia